Krasnye Baki is an urban locality (a work settlement) and the administrative center of Krasnobakovsky District in Nizhny Novgorod Oblast, Russia, located on the Vetluga River. Population:

References

Urban-type settlements in Nizhny Novgorod Oblast
Krasnobakovsky District
Varnavinsky Uyezd